Bloomsburg may refer to:

Places
 Bloomsburg, Ontario, Canada
 Bloomsburg, Pennsylvania, United States
 Bloomsburg (Watkins House), a historic plantation estate in South Boston, Virginia, US

Other
 Bloomsburg University of Pennsylvania
 Bloomsburg Formation, a bedrock unit in the eastern United States

See also
 Bloomberg (disambiguation)
 Blomberg (disambiguation)
 Bloomburg, Texas, a town
 Blumberg, a municipality in Baden-Württemberg, Germany